"'Movin' On" is a song written and performed by English girl group Bananarama. Released on 17 August 1992, it was the first single from their sixth album, Please Yourself (1993). It was produced by Mike Stock and Pete Waterman, two-thirds of the Stock Aitken Waterman (SAW) trio who had produced a number of Bananarama's past hits.

"Movin' On" is an uptempo dance ballad. The single was met with mixed reviews and moderate success when released, peaking at number 24 on the UK Singles Chart. The song was later covered by English band Steps on their second album, Steptacular. In 2012, the song was re-released by Bananarama on their Now or Never EP in a new version.

Critical reception
Quentin Harrison from Albumism wrote, "Now as a duo, their voices and songwriting perspectives were even more closely aligned and that translated to the music as heard on the uptempo ballad of "Movin' On", a thematically timely tune capturing their post-Pop Life mindset." Larry Flick from Billboard called it a "tasty dance confection", adding that "the group's trademark unison vocals are now more tightly focused and interesting to the ear. And yet, they appear more relaxed and playful".

Music video
The music video for "Movin' On" was directed by Philippe Gautier and begins with the girls performing from behind a wooden cut-out of the image that appears on the cover of the single. They emerge from behind it in red evening gowns and descend a staircase as scantily clad showboys with feathered fans perform around them. Several muscular men pose on podiums as live Grecian statues. As a nod to their trademark silliness, they can be seen tussling in the midst of their choreographed descent down the stairs. At the end, the duo exit down the long runway of a stage, and then reappear behind the wooden cut-outs, to the sound of applause.

Track listings
 UK CD 1 single
"Movin' On" (7-inch mix) – 3:32
"Movin' On" (Bumpin' mix) – 6:15 (Remixed by CJ Mackintosh)
"Treat Me Right" – 4:41
"Movin' On" (Spag-A-Nana dub) – 6:17

 UK CD 2 single
"Movin' On" (Straight No Chaser)
"Movin' On" (Bumpin' mix) – 6:15 (remixed by CJ Mackintosh)
"Movin' On" (Spag-a-Nana dub) – 6:17
"Treat Me Right" – 4:41

Charts

References

1992 singles
1992 songs
2012 songs
Bananarama songs
London Records singles
Songs written by Keren Woodward
Songs written by Mike Stock (musician)
Songs written by Pete Waterman
Songs written by Sara Dallin